The Bugatti Centodieci (Italian for "110") is a limited production mid-engine sports car produced by French automotive manufacturer Bugatti. The car is a homage to the Bugatti EB110 and a celebration of the Bugatti marque's 110th birthday. It was revealed on 16 August 2019 at "The Quail – A Motorsports Gathering" in California, United States.

Design  
Based on the Chiron, the car takes design cues from the EB110 such as the five round air intakes which resemble a diamond and the wedge shaped design language. A small horse shoe radiator grille present below the headlamps further harkens back to the EB110. Narrow headlights with LED daytime running function and sharp grooves are used to create an aggressive appearance. The rear consists of eight tail lights along with matt-black quad exhaust pipes placed on either side of a large diffuser, complete with an underbody spoiler and a fixed overhanging rear wing. Due to the use of computer assisted 3D design techniques and the use of Virtual Reality technology, the design team was able to complete the design of the Centodieci in six months. Compared to the Chiron, the Centodieci is fitted with an additional air intake near the oil cooler and an engine bay cover manufactured from glass.

Performance 

Production 
10 units of the Centodieci were produced for customers, in addition to pre-production and test cars. The Centodieci were hand-built in Bugatti's Molsheim factory and deliveries to customers started in June 2022. On 19 December 2022, the tenth and last Bugatti Centodieci was delivered.

See also 
 List of production cars by power output

References 

Centodieci
Rear mid-engine, all-wheel-drive vehicles
Sports cars
Cars introduced in 2019
Cars introduced in 2020